Dumbarton is a census-designated place (CDP) in Henrico County, Virginia, United States. The population was 7,879 at the 2010 census.

Geography
Dumbarton is located at  (37.609295, −77.506031).

Demographics
As of the census of 2000, there were 6,674 people, 3,515 households, and 1,507 families residing in the CDP. The population density was 3,191.8 people per square mile (1,232.9/km2). There were 3,782 housing units at an average density of 1,808.7/sq mi (698.7/km2). The racial makeup of the CDP was 60.41% White, 28.93% African American, 0.27% Native American, 11.2% Asian, 0.01% Pacific Islander, 2.20% from other races, and 2.53% from two or more races. Hispanic or Latino of any race were 4.09% of the population.

There were 3,515 households, out of which 19.9% had children under the age of 18 living with them, 25.7% were married couples living together, 13.8% had a female householder with no husband present, and 57.1% were non-families. 47.6% of all households were made up of individuals, and 20.3% had someone living alone who was 65 years of age or older. The average household size was 1.89 and the average family size was 2.72.

In the CDP, the population was spread out, with 18.4% under the age of 18, 11.9% from 18 to 24, 33.4% from 25 to 44, 16.1% from 45 to 64, and 20.3% who were 65 years of age or older. The median age was 35 years. For every 100 females, there were 78.6 males. For every 100 females age 18 and over, there were 74.2 males.

The median income for a household in the CDP was $33,300, and the median income for a family was $39,583. Males had a median income of $29,682 versus $23,549 for females. The per capita income for the CDP was $21,446. About 5.7% of families and 8.3% of the population were below the poverty line, including 10.2% of those under age 18 and 3.0% of those age 65 or over.

Population history
 1980....8,149
 1990....8,526
 2000....6,674
 2010....7,879

Source U.S. Census Bureau

References

Census-designated places in Virginia
Census-designated places in Henrico County, Virginia